Kokborok grammar is the grammar of the Kokborok language, also known as Tripuri or Tipra which is spoken by the Tripuri people, the native inhabitants of the state of Tripura. It is the official language of Tripura, a state located in Northeast India.

Syntax 
The principal structures of affirmative sentences in Kokborok are the following:

Person 

In Kokborok grammar use of the notion of 'person' is almost absent; the form of verb is same for one who speaks, one who is spoken to, and one who is spoken about.

Number 

In Kokborok there are two numbers: Singular and plural. The plural marker is used at the end of the noun or pronoun. There are two plural markers: rok and song. Rok is universally used while song is used with human nouns only.
The plural marker is normally used at the end of the noun or pronoun. But when the noun has an adjective the plural marker is used at the end of the adjective instead of the noun.

Examples:

 Bwrwirok Teliamura o thangnai. These women will go to Teliamura.
 O bwrwi naithokrok kaham rwchabo. These beautiful women sing very well.

Gender 

In Kokborok there are four genders: masculine gender, feminine gender, common gender, and neuter gender. Words which denote male are masculine, words which denote female are feminine, words which can be both male and female are common gender, and words which cannot be either masculine or feminine are neuter gender.

There are various ways to change genders of words:

Case and case endings 

In Kokborok there are the nominative, accusative, instrumental, ablative, locative and possessive cases.

These case suffixes are used at the end of the noun/pronoun and there is no change in the form of the noun.

Adjective 

In Kokborok the adjectives come after the words they qualify. This rule is strictly followed only in the case of native adjectives. In case of loan adjectives the rule is rather loose. Kokborok adjectives may be divided into four classes:

 pure adjectives
 compound adjectives
 verbal adjectives
 K-adjectives

The first three classes may include both native and loan words. The fourth class is made of purely native words.
e.g.:

 hilik – heavy, heleng – light
 bwkha kotor – (heart big) – brave, bwkha kusu – (heart small) – timid
 leng – tire, lengjak – tired, ruk – to boil, rukjak – boiled.
 kaham – good, kotor – big, kisi – wet.

Numerals 

Kokborok numerals are both decimal and vigesimal.
 sa
 nwi
 tham
 brwi
 ba
 dok
 sni
 char
 chuku
 chi

 ra – hundredth
 sara – one hundred
 sai – thousandth
 sasai- one thousand
 rwjag – a lakh

A numeral is organised as:

See also 

 Tripuri language
 Chinese language
 Burmese language
 Languages of India

References 

 A simplified Kokborok Grammar, by Prof. Prabhas Chandra Dhar, 1987

Kokborok
Sino-Tibetan grammars